The 1812 United States presidential election was the seventh quadrennial presidential election. It was held from Friday, October 30, 1812 to Wednesday, December 2, 1812. Taking place in the shadow of the War of 1812, incumbent Democratic-Republican President James Madison defeated DeWitt Clinton, who drew support from dissident Democratic-Republicans in the North as well as Federalists. It was the first presidential election to be held during a major war involving the United States.

Northern Democratic-Republicans had long been dissatisfied by the Southern dominance of their party, and DeWitt Clinton's uncle, Vice President George Clinton, had unsuccessfully challenged Madison for the party's 1808 presidential nomination. While the May 1812 Democratic-Republican congressional nominating caucus re-nominated Madison, the party's New York caucus, also held in May, nominated Clinton for president. After the United States declared war on the United Kingdom in June 1812, Clinton sought to create a coalition of anti-war Democratic-Republicans and Federalists.  With Clinton in the race, the Federalist Party declined to formally put forth a nominee, hoping its members would vote for Clinton, but they did not formally endorse him, fearing that an explicit endorsement of Clinton would hurt the party's fortunes in other races. Federalist Jared Ingersoll of Pennsylvania became Clinton's de facto running mate. A dissident faction of the Federalist Party attempted to nominate former Vice-Presidential candidate Rufus King over Clinton, but only succeeded in doing so in Virginia.

Despite Clinton's success at attracting Federalist support, Madison was re-elected with 50.4 percent of the popular vote to his opponent's 47.6%, making the 1812 election the closest election up to that point in the popular vote. Clinton won the Federalist bastion of New England as well as three Mid-Atlantic states, but Madison dominated the South and took Pennsylvania. This was the narrowest popular vote margin for a victorious re-elected president until 2004.

Background 
Residual military conflict resulting from the Napoleonic Wars in Europe had been steadily worsening throughout James Madison's first term, with the British Empire and the French Empire both ignoring the neutrality rights of the United States at sea by seizing American ships and looking for supposed British deserters in a practice known as impressment. The British provided additional provocations by impressing American seamen, maintaining forts within United States territory in the Northwest, and supporting American Indians at war with the United States in both the Northwest and Southwest.

Meanwhile, expansionists in the south and west of the United States coveted British Canada and Spanish Florida and wanted to use British provocations as a pretext to seize both areas. The pressure steadily built, with the result that the United States declared war on the United Kingdom on June 12, 1812. This occurred after Madison had been nominated by the Democratic-Republicans, but before the Federalists had made their nomination. He won the nomination with 128 votes.

Nominations

Democratic-Republican Party nomination 

Democratic-Republican candidates:

Many Democratic-Republicans in the northern states were unhappy over the perceived dominance of the presidency by the state of Virginia (three of the last four presidents had been Virginians), and they wished instead to nominate one of their own rather than re-nominate President Madison. Initially, these hopes were pinned upon Vice President George Clinton, but his poor health and advanced age (72) eliminated his chances. Even before Clinton's death on April 20, 1812, his nephew New York Lieutenant Governor DeWitt Clinton was considered the preferred candidate to move against Madison by the northern Democratic-Republicans.

Hoping to forestall a serious movement against President James Madison and a division of the Democratic-Republican Party, some proposed making DeWitt Clinton the nominee for the vice presidency, taking over the same office his uncle now held. DeWitt Clinton was not opposed to the offer, but preferred to wait until after the conclusion of the New York caucus, which would not be held until after the Congressional Caucus had met, to finalize his decision. Early caucuses were held in the states of Virginia and Pennsylvania, both of which pledged their support to Madison.

Eighty-three of the one hundred thirty-eight of the Democratic-Republican members of the United States Congress attended the nominating caucus in May 1812. The delegations from New York and New England had less representation due to the New York members supporting DeWitt Clinton's attempt to gain the support of the Federalists and the New England members opposing Madison's foreign policy. Eighty-two of the delegates voted to give the presidential nomination to Madison while John Langdon won the vice-presidential nomination against Elbridge Gerry by a vote of sixty-four to sixteen. However, Langdon declined the nomination citing his age and it was instead given to Gerry after another vote was held with seventy-four delegates voting for him.

When the New York caucus did meet on May 29, it was dominated by anti-war Democratic-Republicans, and nominated DeWitt Clinton for the presidency almost unanimously. Clinton's now open candidacy was opposed by many who, while not friends of James Madison, feared that Clinton was now apt to tear the Democratic-Republican party asunder. The matter of how to conduct his campaign also became a major problem for Clinton, especially with regards to the war with the British after June 12. Many of Clinton's supporters were war-hawks who advocated extreme measures to force the British into negotiations favorable to the United States, while Clinton knew he would have to appeal to Federalists to win, and they were almost wholly opposed to the war.

Federalist nomination 

Federalist candidates:

Before Clinton entered the race as an alternative to President Madison, Chief Justice John Marshall was a favorite for the Federalist presidential nomination, a relatively popular figure who could carry much of the Northeast while potentially taking Virginia and North Carolina as well. But with Clinton in the race, the Federalists would no longer be able to count on the electoral votes of New York, possibly throwing the election into the House of Representatives, dominated by Democratic-Republicans, where Madison would almost certainly be elected.

In the face of these facts, the Federalist party considered endorsing Clinton's candidacy for a time, but at their caucus in September it was decided that the party simply would not field a presidential candidate that year and did not endorse Clinton. Though there was much support among the Federalists for Clinton, it was felt that openly endorsing him as the party's choice for president would damage his chances in states where the Federalists remained unpopular and drive away Democratic-Republicans who would normally be supportive of his candidacy. A Federalist caucus in Pennsylvania chose to nominate Jared Ingersoll, the Attorney General of the state, as Clinton's vice presidential running-mate, a move Clinton decided to support considering the importance of Pennsylvania's electors.

Straight-Federalist nomination 

While many Federalists were supportive of DeWitt Clinton's candidacy, others were not so keen, skeptical of Clinton's positions regarding the war and other matters. Rufus King, a former diplomat and Representative, had led an effort at the September Caucus to nominate a Federalist ticket for the election that year, though he was ultimately unsuccessful. Still, some wished to enter King's name into the race under the Federalist label, and while very little came of it, it caused problems for the Clinton campaign in two states.

In the case of Virginia, Clinton was rejected entirely by the state Federalist Party, which instead chose to nominate Rufus King for president and William Richardson Davie for vice president. The ticket would acquire about 27% of the vote in the state. In New York, with the Federalists having gained control of the state legislature that summer, it was planned that the Federalists would nominate a slate pledged to Rufus King now that they had the majority. However, a coalition of Democratic-Republicans and Federalists would defeat the motion and succeed in nominating a slate pledged to Clinton.

General election

Campaign 
The war heavily overshadowed the campaign. Clinton continued his regional campaigning, adopting an anti-war stance in the Northeast (which was most harmed by the war), and a pro-war stance in the South and West. The election ultimately hinged on New York and Pennsylvania, and while Clinton took his home state, he failed to take Pennsylvania and thus lost the election. Though Clinton lost, the election was the best showing for the Federalists since that of Adams, as the party made gains in Congress and kept the presidential election reasonably close. Clintonite Democratic-Republicans in many states refused to work with their Federalist counterparts (notably in Pennsylvania) and Clinton was generally regarded by most as the Federalist candidate, though he was not formally nominated by them. 

Madison was the first of just four presidents in United States history to win re-election with a lower percentage of the electoral vote than in their prior elections, as Madison won 69.3% of the electoral vote in 1808, but only won 58.7% of the electoral vote in 1812. The other three were Woodrow Wilson in 1916, Franklin D. Roosevelt in 1940 and 1944 and Barack Obama in 2012. Additionally, Madison was the first of only five presidents to win re-election with a smaller percentage of the popular vote than in prior elections, although in 1812, only 6 of the 18 states chose electors by popular vote. The other four are Andrew Jackson in 1832, Grover Cleveland in 1892, Franklin Roosevelt in 1940 and 1944 and Obama in 2012.

Results 

Source (Popular Vote): United States Presidential Elections, 1788-1860: The Official Results by Michael J. Dubin
Source (Popular Vote): A New Nation Votes: American Election Returns 1787–1825
Source (Electoral Vote): 

(a) Only 9 of the 18 states chose electors by popular vote.
(b) Those states that did choose electors by popular vote had widely varying restrictions on suffrage via property requirements.
(c) One Elector from Ohio did not vote.

Popular vote by state 
The popular vote totals used are the elector from each party with the highest total of votes. The vote totals of Kentucky appear to be incomplete, and those of Tennessee appear to be lost.

States where the margin of victory was under 5% 
 Maryland, 3.52% (954 votes)

Electoral college selection 

In New Jersey, Federalists had just taken over the state legislature and decided to change the method of choosing electors from a general election to appointment by state legislature. Some towns, possibly too far away to get the news, or in open defiance of the switch, held elections anyway. These were not counted nor reported by the newspapers. In the unofficial elections, Madison received 1,672 votes while Clinton only received 2, suggesting these were protest votes (New Jersey was far more competitive than this at the time).

See also
 History of the United States (1789–1849)
 1812–13 United States House of Representatives elections
 1812–13 United States Senate elections
 Second inauguration of James Madison

Notes

References

Bibliography
 
 
 A New Nation Votes: American Election Returns, 1787–1825

External links

 Presidential Election of 1812: A Resource Guide from the Library of Congress
 
 Election of 1812 in Counting the Votes 

 
Presidency of James Madison
James Madison